Duncan C. Ross (March 12, 1856 – September 8, 1919) was a wrestler in the 1880s. He lost to Catch as Can Style Wrestling Champion Edwin Bibby in 1881 for the American Heavyweight Championship.

He was a famous Scotch athlete who was the Cornish wrestling champion of New Zealand in 1891. He also fought in mixed style challenge matches including Cornish wrestling in the US in the 1890s. He also claimed the all round championship at wrestling and weight throwing.

Championships and accomplishments
American Heavyweight Championship (1 time)
American/World Graeco-Roman Championship
American/World Mixed Style Championship
American Collar-and-Elbow Championship
Cornish wrestling champion of New Zealand in 1891.

References 

Turkish male sport wrestlers
British Army recipients of the Victoria Cross
Turkish professional wrestlers
Turkish people of Scottish descent
Year of birth uncertain
1919 deaths
19th-century professional wrestlers